is a Japanese actress and voice actress employed by Ogipro The Next Co. Inc. & BQMAP. Taking a well-trod path by many voice actresses, she often voices young male characters with generally very quirky and goofy personalities. One of her most well-known roles includes Naruto Uzumaki from the popular anime series Naruto. She has played Takuya Kanbara in Digimon Frontier, Rin Natsuki/Cure Rouge in Yes! PreCure 5, Metabee in Medabots, Mamoru Endou in Inazuma Eleven and Inazuma Eleven GO, Gon Freecss in the 1999 version of Hunter × Hunter, and GingerBrave in Cookie Run: Kingdom.

Personal life
She is the youngest of three children. As a child she studied ballet and piano for seven and a half years. She enrolled in 1991 at Nihon University, College of Art but dropped out two years later. For several years she worked as a shoe salesperson and gave piano lessons at a private school in Tokyo. Originally she wanted to work in a bank office. In 1996 she joined BQ MAP Theater Company where she had several stage appearances. She met voice actor Kenji Hamada in 1999. They married in 2006. Their first child was born in 2012 and the other one in 2017.

Filmography

Anime

Film
Naruto the Movie: Ninja Clash in the Land of Snow (2004) – Naruto Uzumaki
Naruto the Movie: Legend of the Stone of Gelel (2005) – Naruto Uzumaki
Naruto the Movie: Guardians of the Crescent Moon Kingdom (2006) – Naruto Uzumaki
Naruto Shippuden the Movie (2007) – Naruto Uzumaki
Yes! PreCure 5 the Movie: Great Miraculous Adventure in the Mirror Kingdom! (2007) – Rin Natsuki/Cure Rouge
Naruto Shippuden the Movie: Bonds (2008) – Naruto Uzumaki
Yes! PreCure 5 GoGo! the Movie: Happy Birthday in the Sweets Kingdom (2008) – Rin Natsuki/Cure Rouge
Tamagotchi: Happiest Story in the Universe! (2008) – Kikitchi
Naruto Shippuden the Movie: The Will of Fire (2009) – Naruto Uzumaki
Pretty Cure All Stars DX: Minna Tomodachi— Kiseki no Zenin Daishūgō (2009) – Rin Natsuki/Cure Rouge
Naruto Shippuden the Movie: The Lost Tower (2010) – Naruto Uzumaki
Inazuma Eleven The Movie: The Final Force, The Ogre Team Strikes (2010) – Mamoru Endō
Pretty Cure All Stars DX2: Kibō no Hikari— Rainbow Jewel o Mamore! (2010) – Rin Natsuki/Cure Rouge
Naruto Shippuden the Movie: Blood Prison (2011) – Naruto Uzumaki
Pretty Cure All-Stars DX3 Mirai ni Todoke! Sekai o Tsunagu Niji-Iro no Hana (2011) – Rin Natsuki/Cure Rouge
Onegai My Melody: Yu&Ai (2012) – Kuromi
Road to Ninja: Naruto the Movie (2012) – Naruto Uzumaki
Inazuma Eleven GO vs Danball Senki W (2012) – Mamoru Endō
Pretty Cure All-Stars New Stage 3: Eien no Tomodachi (2014) – Rin Natsuki/Cure Rouge
Inazuma Eleven Chou Jigen Dream Match (2014) – Mamoru Endō
The Last: Naruto the Movie (2014) – Naruto Uzumaki
Boruto: Naruto the Movie (2015) – Naruto Uzumaki
Digimon Adventure: Last Evolution Kizuna (2020) – Gomamon
Healin' Good Pretty Cure GoGo! Big Transformation! The Town of Dreams (2021) – Rin Natsuki/Cure Rouge

Drama CDs
Mainichi Seiten! – Mayumi Obinata
Soul Eater – Maka Albarn
The Day of Revolution – Kei/Megumi Yoshikawa
Yours For An Hour – Haru Hinomoto

Video games
Puzzle Star Sweep (1997) – Domingo
Street Fighter Zero 3 (1998) – R. Mika
Garou: Mark of the Wolves (1999) – Hokutomaru
Hunter × Hunter: Altar of Dragon Vein (2001) – Gon Freecss
Naruto video games (2003–present) – Naruto Uzumaki
Radiata Stories (2005) – Jack Russell
Ape Escape 3 (2005) – Satoru
Quantum Leap Layzelber (2005) – Chyota
Corpse Seed (2007) – Honoka Yamato
Inazuma Eleven (2008) – Mamoru Endō 
Inazuma Eleven 2 (2009) – Mamoru Endō 
Inazuma Eleven 3 (2010) – Mamoru Endō, Kanon Endō
Inazuma Eleven Strikers (2011) – Mamoru Endō, Kanon Endō
Inazuma Eleven Strikers 2012 Xtreme (2011) – Mamoru Endō, Kanon Endō
Inazuma Eleven GO (2011) – Mamoru Endō
Inazuma Eleven GO 2: Chrono Stone (2012) – Mamoru Endō
Inazuma Eleven GO: Galaxy (2013) – Mamoru Endō
Yu-Gi-Oh! Duel Links (2016) – Mokuba Kaiba
Yo-kai Watch: Wibble Wobble (2017-2019) – Kuromi, Mamoru Endō
Fire Emblem Heroes (2019) – Louise, Lugh
Inazuma Eleven SD (2020) – Mamoru Endō
Cookie Run: Kingdom (2021) – GingerBrave

Dubbing

Live-action
Bull – Marissa Morgan (Geneva Carr)
Cop Car – Travis (James Freedson-Jackson)
Frailty – young Fenton (Matt O'Leary)
The Golden Compass (2010 TV Asahi edition) – Billy Costa (Charlie Rowe)
A Lot like Love – Emily Friehl (Amanda Peet)
Snake Eyes – Ana DeCobray / Baroness (Úrsula Corberó)
The Thing About Pam – Leah Askey (Judy Greer)
Touch – Jacob Bohm (David Mazouz)

Animation
The Amazing World of Gumball – Gumball Watterson
Beat Bugs – Jay
Curious George – Bill
Toy Story 4 – Giggle McDimples
W.I.T.C.H. – Taranee Cook
Zootopia – Dawn Bellwether

Discography

Songs
 "Oh! Enka!" (Naruto)
 "Life Goes On" (Naruto)
 "Naruto's Neko Song" (Naruto)
 "Gyu-ru-ru" (as Naruto Uzumaki) (Naruto)
 "Touki ~Fighting Spirits~" (Naruto)
 "Naruto Ondo" (as Naruto Uzumaki) (Naruto (with Chie Nakamura and Showtaro Morikubo))
 "Distance" (as Naruto Uzumaki) (Naruto All Stars)
 "Tsubomi" (as Naruto Uzumaki) (Naruto All Stars)
 "Salamander" (as Takuya Kanbara) (Digimon Frontier)
 Secret Rendezvous (as Takuya Kanbara) (Digimon Frontier)
 "Muteki na Bataashi" (as Gomamon) (Digimon Adventure 02)
 "Sora wo Kurooru (as Gomamon) (Digimon Adventure 02 (with Masami Kikuchi))
 "Chie to Yuuki da! Medarotto" (as Metabee) (Medarot)
 Kaze no Muki ga Kattara (as Gon) (Hunter x Hunter)
 Tobira (Gon and Killua version) (Hunter x Hunter (with Mitsuhashi Kanako))
 Hunter Ondo (Hunter x Hunter (with Mitsuhashi Kanako and Kaida Yuki and Goda Hozumi))
 GONtte yatsu wa (Hunter x Hunter (with Mitsuhashi Kanako and Kaida Yuki and Goda Hozumi))
 ONNAtte subarashii (as Jango-sama) (Hunter x Hunter)
 Tabidachi (as Gon) (Hunter x Hunter)
 Taisetsuna koto (as Gon) (Hunter x Hunter (with Mitsuhashi Kanako))
 Te o Tsunaide (as Gon) (Hunter x Hunter (with Mitsuhashi Kanako))
 Futari (Ask Dr. Rin! (with Kana Kouguchi))
 Tomo Yo (as Ted) (Konjiki no Gash Bell!!)
 Kuroi Hitomi (as Kuromi) (Onegai My Melody)
 Kuromi Rondo (as Kuromi) (Onegai My Melody)
 Kuromi Punk (as Kuromi) (Onegai My Melody)
 Lambo-san's Ambition (as Lambo) (Reborn)
 Gyouza Gyuudon no Uta (as Lambo ) ("Reborn") (with Li Mei Chan)
 Yakusoku no Bashou (as Lambo ) ("Reborn") (with Vongola's Family)
 A fun song (as Lambo ) ("Reborn") (with Li Mei Chan)
 Tatta Latta (as Lambo ) ("Reborn") (with Li Mei Chan, Yuuna Inamura, Askesaka Satomi and Hitomi Yoshida
 Mirai no Oozora e (as Lambo ) ("Reborn") (with Vongola's Family)
Mata ne no Kisetsu – 7th ending to Inazuma Eleven (as Endou Mamoru)
Mamotte Miseru! – (Inazuma Eleven CD – Endou Mamoru Character Songs)
Dakara Zettai Daijoubu – (Inazuma Eleven) as Endou Mamoru
Maji de Kansha (as Endou Mamoru) (Inazuma Eleven cast)
Reversible – (as Rin Natsuki) (Yes! PreCure 5)
Jounetsu – (as Rin Natsuki) (Yes! PreCure 5)
Okaerinasai – (as Rin Natsuki) (Yes! PreCure 5 GoGo!) (with Yūko Sanpei)

References

Nakagami, Yoshikatsu et al. "Voice Actress Spotlight". (June 2007) Newtype USA. pp. 112–113.

External links
  
 Junko Takeuchi at GamePlaza-Haruka Voice Acting Database 
 Junko Takeuchi at Hitoshi Doi's Seiyuu Database
 Junko Takeuchi at Ryu's Seiyuu Info
 
 

1972 births
Living people
Japanese stage actresses
Japanese video game actresses
Japanese voice actresses
Amuse Inc. talents
Nihon University alumni
Voice actresses from Saitama Prefecture
20th-century Japanese actresses
21st-century Japanese actresses